Chul-soon is a Korean masculine given name. Its meaning differs based on the hanja used to write each syllable of the name. There are 11 hanja with the reading "chul" and 31 hanja with the reading "soon" on the South Korean government's official list of hanja which may be registered for use in given names.

People with this name include:
Park Chul-soon (born 1956), South Korean baseball player
Hwang Chul-soon (born 1957), South Korean former boxer
Choi Chul-soon (born 1987), South Korean footballer

See also
List of Korean given names

References

Korean masculine given names